The 2006–07 season was the 61st season in Rijeka's history. It was their 16th season in the Prva HNL and 33rd successive top tier season.

Competitions

Prva HNL

Classification

Results summary

Results by round

Matches

Croatian Supercup

Source: HRnogomet.com

Prva HNL

Source: HRnogomet.com

Croatian Cup

Source: HRnogomet.com

UEFA Cup

Source: HRnogomet.com

Squad statistics
Competitive matches only.  Appearances in brackets indicate numbers of times the player came on as a substitute.

See also
2006–07 Prva HNL
2006–07 Croatian Cup
2006–07 UEFA Cup

References

External sources
 2006–07 Prva HNL at HRnogomet.com
 2006–07 Croatian Cup at HRnogomet.com 
 Prvenstvo 2006.-2007. at nk-rijeka.hr

HNK Rijeka seasons
Rijeka